Kyambogo is a neighborhood in Kampala, Uganda. It is within Nakawa Division, an administrative borough of Kampala, Uganda's capital city.

Location
The neighborhood is bordered by Kiwatule to the north, Banda to the east, Kinnawattaka to the southeast, Mbuya to the south, Nakawa to the southwest, Ntinda to the west and northwest. The coordinates of Kyambogo are:0°20'54.0"N 32°37'49.0"E (Latitude:0.348334; Longitude:32.630275).

History
Little is known about the history of Kyambogo prior to 1958. That year, Uganda Polytechnic Kyambogo (UPK) which had been established on Makerere Hill in 1928, was transferred to Kyambogo. Its role was to train Ugandan technicians and artisans. In 1948, the Institute of Teacher Education Kyambogo (ITEK) was established. Its first home was in Nyakasura, Kabarole District. It was subsequently moved to Mbarara and finally to Kyambogo as well. In 1988, the Uganda National Institute of Special Education (UNISE), originally a department at ITEK, was spun off as a separate institution. In 2003, the three institutions were merged to form Kyambogo University, the third public university  to be established in Uganda.

Points of interest
The points of interest in Kyambogo, include the following:

Kyambogo University - One of the seven public universities in Uganda
East African Polytechnic college kyambogo - A professional Association organisation and registry of vocational professionals  
 Kyambogo College School - A mixed, non-residential public secondary school
Nabisunsa Girls Secondary School - An all-girl residential O-Level and A-Level institution of learning.
 a branch of Dfcu bank
 A branch of Stanbic Bank

See also

References

External links
Kampala City Guide
Profile of Banda Hill

Populated places in Uganda
Cities in the Great Rift Valley
Kampala District